That Lady from Peking is an Australian crime film directed by Eddie Davis and starring Carl Betz, Nancy Kwan and Bobby Rydell. Although shot in 1969 it was not screened commercially until 1975.

It was the last of three films Eddie Davis made in Australia.

Plot
A defecting Russian diplomat has arranged to meet with author Max Foster in Hong Kong, promising a diary that will tell the truth about Red China. The diplomat is murdered and Foster tries to find the diary, which takes him to Sydney. Chinese, Russian and American spies take after him.

Cast
 Carl Betz - Max Foster
 Nancy Kwan - Sue Ten Chan
 Bobby Rydell - Buddy Foster
 Sid Melton - Bunny Segal
 Don Reid - Spronsky
 Eva Lynd - Natalia
 Vicki Benet - Tess
 Owen Weingott - Barina
 Sandy Gore - Marisa Russo
 Graham Rouse - Varitch
 Kevin Golsby - Butcher
 Penny Sugg - Shirley
 John Warwick - Inspector
 Susan Jarett - Lydia
 Robert Bruning - Karl
Jack Thompson - spy

Production
Shooting began in Sydney in July 1969, with some exteriors shot in Hong Kong.

Church scenes shot at St.John's Anglican Church, Wilberforce NSW Australia.

Release
The film was poorly received, commercially and critically.

References

External links

That Lady from Peking at Bobbyrydell.com
That Lady from Peking at BFI
That Lady from Peking at Oz Movies

1969 films
Australian crime drama films
1960s crime films
Films directed by Eddie Davis
1960s English-language films